Rakhi or Rakhee is a 2006 Indian Telugu-language film directed by Krishna Vamsi and starring Jr. NTR, Ileana D'Cruz and Charmme Kaur. Suhasini, Sarath Babu, Chandra Mohan, Brahmaji, Kota Srinivasa Rao, Saranya Ponvannan, Brahmanandam, Sunil, and Sayaji Shinde play other supporting roles. The music of the movie was composed by Devi Sri Prasad with cinematography by S. Gopal Reddy action sequences by Stun Shiva and editing by Shankar.

This film was released on 22 December 2006 with 250 prints. The movie was a Superhit at the box office .

Plot
Ramakrishna aka Rakhi (Jr. NTR) aspires to become a railway stationmaster like his father (Chandra Mohan). His love interest and close friend Tripura (Ileana D'Cruz) is a reporter in a TV channel who exposes atrocities against women in the society. For Rakhi, his sister Gayathri (Manjusha) is everything. She is married off to a software professional (Ravi Varma) who plans to go to the USA. However, his uncle brings a proposal where he would get 1 crore as dowry. At first they try to get rid of her by fighting with Rakhi and demanding for more dowry, but when Gayathri overhears them they burn her alive. Devastated by this as she was also pregnant, Rakhi's family tries to sue them in court but corrupt lawyers, policemen, and doctors fabricate that Gayathri was mentally disturbed and committed suicide. Rakhi was unable to accept this. In a fit of rage, he burns her in-laws and all those people alive who fabricated things about her in front of the court in the same way as Gayathri's in-laws burnt her alive. He then starts a manhunt for all sex offenders and perverted men and burns them alive while dropping a rakhi at every site. A police officer named Meenakshi Iyer (Suhasini) is leading the hunt for him, and the entire police force is under a dilemma as the public women all consider Rakhi to be a god and all men are staying away from women so as to not be killed. Rakhi eventually surrenders to Meenakshi, and goes to jail but it is revealed that he did so to kill his sister's friend's murderer, a love crazed man (Amit Tiwari) who killed her friend because of repeatedly refusing his proposal. Meenakshi talks to Rakhi after being verbally abused and kicked by a minister whose son also was killed by Rakhi, and she realizes that what Rakhi is doing is correct as the law is protecting all those men from death after abusing women. Rakhi also kills the minister (Sayaji Shinde) after he placed a bomb outside Rakhi's jail that killed many women who came forward to Rakhi to tie Rakhi's on his wrist, including his cousin Gowri (Charmme Kaur). Rakhi goes to court and the judge (Prakash Raj) also sees that Rakhi did a justice to the country, resigns from his post and announces that he will be Rakhi's lawyer and get him acquitted. The film ends with Rakhi motivating all the women present outside the court in support of him.

Cast

 Jr. NTR as K. Ramakrishna (Rakhi)
 Ileana D'Cruz as Tripura Sundari
 Charmme Kaur as Gowri, Rakhi's cousin
 Suhasini as Meenakshi Iyer
 Sarath Babu as Police Commissioner 
 Chandra Mohan as Mohan Rao, Rakhi's father
 Bramhaji as Ranga, Rakhi's brother
 Kota Srinivasa Rao as Rakhi's grandfather
 Saranya Ponvannan as Gowri's mother
 Brahmanandam as TV Channel Owner
 Sunil as Mohan Reddy
 Sayaji Shinde as Minister
 Manjusha as Gayathri, Rakhi's sister
 Ravi Varma as Gayathri's husband
 Master Ajai  as Meenakshi Iyer's son
 Ranii Pandey as Prostitution Racket Head
 Bharat as Bharat, Minister's son
 Dharmavarapu Subramanyam as Marriage broker
 Tanikella Bharani as Criminal lawyer Sachidanandam
 M. S. Narayana
 Harsha Vardhan as Auto driver
 Kondavalasa Lakshmana Rao
 Uttej
 Amit Tiwari as Madhukar
 Bharath Reddy as Bharat's friend
 Sameer as Police Inspector
 Satyam Rajesh as Police Officer
 Krishna Bhagavaan as Minister's aide
 Prakash Raj as Judge (Guest role)
 Raghu Karumanchi

Music
The film has six songs composed by Devi Sri Prasad. The music was well received.

Release
The film was released in 545 screens, including 431 in Andhra Pradesh, 29 in Karnataka, six in Orissa, three in Tamil Nadu, three in Mumbai and 73 overseas. The film's dubbed versions were released in Tamil, Hindi and Bhojpuri as Rakhi, The Return of Kaalia (2007) and Kaalia (2016) respectively.Also Dubbed to Kannada Name as same title

Reception
The film had a 100-day run in 30-centres.

References

External links
 

2006 films
Indian action drama films
Indian vigilante films
Films directed by Krishna Vamsi
Fictional portrayals of the Andhra Pradesh Police
2006 action drama films
2000s vigilante films
2000s Telugu-language films
Indian films about revenge
Films about social issues in India